The Wrong Guy is a 1997 Canadian black comedy film directed by David Steinberg, and starring Dave Foley, along with David Anthony Higgins, Jennifer Tilly, Colm Feore and Joe Flaherty. It was written by Foley, Higgins and Jay Kogen.

The script was originally inspired by a sketch Foley wrote during his days with The Kids in the Hall.

Synopsis
Dorky executive Nelson Hibbert (Foley) gets passed over for a promotion after spending years angling for the job (including marrying one of his boss's daughters). Upon hearing the decision, he ends up shouting "I swear I will kill you!" as security drags him from the board room. Later, when he goes to confront his boss (Kenneth Welsh), he finds that the man has already been murdered, and, due to the scene he made earlier, assumes that he will be mistaken for the murderer.  Nelson flees, unaware that security cameras have already revealed the identity of the true killer to the authorities. Nelson tries to escape to Mexico, but along the way he meets both the real killer (Feore) and the murder's investigator, Detective Arlen (Higgins), who Nelson believes is trailing him. It turns out that Ken Daly, who acquired the promotion, had the company president killed in order to gain the spot quickly. Chaotic events transpire and Nelson meets a narcoleptic farm girl (Tilly). What follows is a bizarre series of misadventures marked with slapstick routines and constant one-liners.

Cast
 Dave Foley as Nelson Hibbert
 David Anthony Higgins as Detective Arlen
 Colm Feore as The Killer
 Jennifer Tilly as Lynn Holden
 Joe Flaherty as Fred Holden
 Dan Redican as Ken Daly
 Richard Chevolleau as Jimmy
 Alan Scarfe as Farmer Brown
 Kenneth Welsh as Mr. Nagel
 Enrico Colantoni as Creepy Guy
 Kevin McDonald as Motel Manager
 Jay Kogen as Bus Driver
 David Steinberg as Outpatient in Neck Brace

The members of Barenaked Ladies made cameos as singing policemen.

Release
Foley described The Wrong Guy as his best film.

The film was released direct-to-video in the United States.

Awards
 Film Discovery Jury Award (U.S. Comedy Arts Festival) - Best Screenplay Dave Foley, David Anthony Higgins, Jay Kogen

References

External links
 
 

1997 films
English-language Canadian films
1990s English-language films
Canadian comedy films
1997 comedy films
1990s Canadian films